Pearson Television was the British-based television production and distribution arm of a British company Pearson PLC.

History 
In 1994 after a bidding war, Pearson PLC bought the former British ITV franchisee Thames Television. Then in 1995 it acquired Australian production company Grundy Television. Allied Communications Inc. (ACI), a U.S.-based distributor of made-for-television films, was purchased later that year for $40 million. 
In 1996, Pearson Television bought the British production company SelecTV PLC, and merged into it.

On October 1, 1997, Pearson Television announced that it would launch a $373 million cash tender offer for publicly traded U.S. television company All American Communications Inc. On 5 November, Pearson completed its tender offer, and All American was merged into Pearson Television the following year, while All American Music Group was sold to Zomba Records subsidiary Volcano Entertainment. This acquisition gave Pearson worldwide rights to various game show formats such as  Family Feud and The Price Is Right as well as drama series in the U.S. such as Baywatch.

Pearson Television acquired Italian drama production company Mastrofilm on 3 November 1998, and European animation financer and distributor EVA Entertainment on 2 February 1999.

In April 2000, Pearson TV announced that it would acquire Smith & Jones' UK production company Talkback Productions. Pearson Television ended in 2001 when they merged its television interests with those of Bertelsmann's CLT-UFA, forming the RTL Group. Subsequently, the RTL Group became wholly owned by Bertelsmann as it bought out Pearson's interests and those of CLT.

In the following year, Pearson Television was re-branded as FremantleMedia, which subsequently rebranded as simply Fremantle in 2018.

References

External links 
 

Television syndication distributors
Defunct mass media companies of the United Kingdom
Mass media companies established in 1996
Mass media companies disestablished in 2001
Former Bertelsmann subsidiaries
RTL Group